Alan Louis Charles Bullock, Baron Bullock,  (13 December 1914 – 2 February 2004) was a British historian. He is best known for his book Hitler: A Study in Tyranny (1952), the first comprehensive biography of Adolf Hitler, which influenced many other Hitler biographies.

Early life and career
Bullock was born in Trowbridge, Wiltshire, England, where his father worked as a gardener and a Unitarian preacher. He was educated at Bradford Grammar School and Wadham College, Oxford, where he read classics and modern history. After graduating in 1938, he worked as a research assistant for Winston Churchill, who was writing his History of the English-Speaking Peoples. He was a Harmsworth Senior Scholar at Merton College, Oxford, from 1938 to 1940. During World War II, Bullock worked for the European Service of the British Broadcasting Corporation (BBC). After the war, he returned to Oxford as a history fellow at New College.

Bullock was the censor of St Catherine's Society (1952-1962) and then founding master of St Catherine's College, Oxford (1962-1981), a college for undergraduates and graduates, divided between students of the sciences and the arts. He was credited with massive fundraising efforts to develop the college. Later, he was the first full-time Vice-Chancellor of Oxford University (1969-1973).

Bullock served as chairman of the National Advisory Committee on the Training and Supply of Teachers (1963-1965), the Schools' Council (1966-1969), the Committee of Inquiry into Reading and the Use of English (1972-1974), and the Committee of Inquiry on Industrial Democracy (1976-1977).

Bullock first became known to the general public when he appeared on the informational BBC radio program The Brains Trust.

Hitler: A Study in Tyranny 
In 1952, Bullock published Hitler: A Study in Tyranny, the first comprehensive biography of Adolf Hitler, which he based on the transcripts of the Nuremberg Trials. The book dominated Hitler scholarship for many years and characterised Hitler as an opportunistic Machtpolitiker ("power politician"). In Bullock's opinion, Hitler was a "mountebank" and an opportunistic adventurer devoid of principles, beliefs or scruples whose actions throughout his career were motivated only by a lust for power. 

Bullock's views led in the 1950s to a debate with Hugh Trevor-Roper, who argued that Hitler had possessed beliefs, albeit repulsive ones, and that his actions had been motivated by them. Bullock's Guardian obituary commented, "Bullock's famous maxim 'Hitler was jobbed into power by backstairs intrigue' has stood the test of time".

When reviewing Hitler and Stalin in The Times in 1991, John Campbell wrote of Hitler: A Study in Tyranny: "Although written so soon after the end of the war and despite a steady flow of fresh evidence and reinterpretation, it has not been surpassed in nearly 40 years: an astonishing achievement".

In subsequent works, Bullock, to some extent, changed his mind about Hitler. His later writings showed the dictator as much more of an ideologue, who had pursued the ideas expressed in Mein Kampf and elsewhere despite their consequences. That has become a widely-accepted view of Hitler, particularly in relation to the Holocaust.

Taking note of the shift in interest among professional historians towards social history, Bullock agreed that deep long-term social forces are generally decisive in history, but he considered that there are times in which the Great Man is decisive. In revolutionary circumstances, "It is possible for an individual to exert a powerful even a decisive influence on the way events develop and the policies that are followed".

Other works 
Bullock's other works included The Humanist Tradition in the West (1985), Has History a Future? (1977), Great Lives of the Twentieth Century (1989), Meeting Teachers' Management Needs (1988), The forming of the nation (1969), Is History Becoming a Social Science? The Case of Contemporary History (1977) and The Life and Times of Ernest Bevin (1960). The last was a three-volume biography of British Labour Foreign Secretary Ernest Bevin. Bullock was also editor of The Harper Dictionary of Modern Thought (1977), a project that he suggested to the publisher when he found he could not define the word "hermeneutics". He had earlier co-edited with Maurice Shock a collection on The Liberal Tradition: From Fox to Keynes.

In the mid-1970s, Bullock used his committee skills to produce a report which proved to be influential in the classroom, A Language for Life, about reading and the teaching of English, which was published in 1975. Bullock also chaired the committee of inquiry on industrial democracy commissioned in December 1975 by the second Labour government of Harold Wilson. The committee's report, which was also known as the Bullock Report, published in 1977, recommended workers' control in large companies with employees having a right to hold representative worker directorships.

Bullock also appeared as a political pundit, particularly during the BBC coverage of the 1959 British general election.

Later works 
Late in his life, Bullock published Hitler and Stalin: Parallel Lives (1991). A massive and influential work which he described in the introduction as "essentially a political biography, set against the background of the times in which they lived". He showed how the careers of Hitler and Joseph Stalin fed off each other to some extent. Bullock comes to a thesis that Stalin's ability to consolidate power in his home country and, unlike Hitler, not to over-extend himself enabled him to retain power longer than Hitler. It was awarded the 1992 Wolfson History Prize.

American historian Ronald Spector, writing in The Washington Post, praised Bullock's ability to write about the development of Nazism and Soviet Communism without either abstract generalization or irrelevant detail. "The writing is invariably interesting and informed and there are new insights and cogent analysis in every chapter," he wrote. Amikam Nachmani says Hitler and Stalin "come out as two blood-thirsty, pathologically evil, sanguine tyrants, who are sure of the presence of determinism, hence having unshakeable beliefs that Destiny assigned on them historical missions—the one to pursue a social industrialized revolution in the Soviet Union, the other to turn Germany into a global empire."

Honours
Bullock was decorated with the award of the Chevalier, Legion of Honour in 1970, and knighted in 1972, becoming Sir Alan Bullock and on 30 January 1976 he was created a life peer as Baron Bullock, of Leafield in the County of Oxfordshire. His writings always appeared under the name "Alan Bullock".

In May 1976, Bullock was awarded an honorary degree from the Open University as Doctor of the University.

Death 
Bullock died on 2 February 2004, in Oxford, England.

See also 
 Historiography of Adolf Hitler
 List of Adolf Hitler books
 William L. Shirer  
 Louis Leo Snyder

References

Further reading
 Caston, Geoffrey. "Alan Bullock: historian, social democrat and chairman." Oxford Review of Education 32.1 (2006): 87-103.
 Nachmani, Amikam. "Alan Bullock, 1914–2004: 'I Only Write Enormous Books'." Diplomacy and Statecraft 16.4 (2005): 779-786 online.
Rosenbaum, Ron, Explaining Hitler: the search for the origins of his evil, New York: Random House, 1998. .

Primary sources
 Bullock, Alan. Hitler, A Study in Tyranny (Abridged edition 1971) 
 Bullock, Alan. Hitler and Stalin: Parallel Lives (1991)

1914 births
2004 deaths
People from Trowbridge
People educated at Bradford Grammar School
Alumni of Wadham College, Oxford
Crossbench life peers
English biographers
Historians of Nazism
Knights Bachelor
Fellows of New College, Oxford
Masters of St Catherine's College, Oxford
Vice-Chancellors of the University of Oxford
Social Democratic Party (UK) politicians
20th-century English historians
Fellows of the British Academy
Alumni of Merton College, Oxford
Life peers created by Elizabeth II